Common names: hognose pitvipers.

Porthidium is a genus of venomous pitvipers found in Mexico and southward to northern South America. The name is derived from the Greek word portheo and the suffix -idus, which mean "destroy" and "having the nature of", apparently a reference to the venom. As of August 2016 nine species are recognized as being valid. The snakes of the genus Hypnale in southern India and Sri Lanka look quite similar to those of this genus, possibly an example of convergent evolution.

Description
In addition, the body shape ranges from relatively slender (P. ophryomegas) to relatively stout (P. nasutum). All have a sharply defined canthus rostralis and a rostral scale that is higher than it is broad. The tip of the snout may be slightly to moderately elevated (P. hespere, P. lansbergii, P. ophryomegas and P. volcanicum), strongly elevated (P. dunni and P. yucatanicum), or not elevated at all. 
All species have a color pattern that usually consists of a brown or gray ground color, overlaid with a series of dark paraventral blotches that are separated by a pale and narrow vertebral stripe. The blotches are square, rectangular, or triangular in shape. In some species, the color pattern is determined by the sex.

Geographic range
Found in Mexico (Colima, Oaxaca and Chiapas on the Pacific side, the Yucatán Peninsula on the Atlantic side) southward through Central America to northern South America (Ecuador in the Pacific lowlands, northern Venezuela in the Atlantic lowlands).

Species

*) Not including the nominate subspecies.
T) Type species.

Nota bene: A binomial authority in parentheses indicates that the species was originally described in a genus other than Porthidium.

References

Further reading
Cope ED (1871). "Ninth Contribution to the Herpetology of Tropical America". Proceedings of the Academy of Natural Sciences of Philadelphia 23 (2): 200-224. (Porthidium, new genus, p. 207).

External links

 

 
Taxa named by Edward Drinker Cope